is a Japanese light novel series written by Ceez and illustrated by Tenmaso. It was serialized online between November 2010 and December 2012 on the user-generated novel publishing website Shōsetsuka ni Narō. It was later acquired by Enterbrain, who have published eight volumes since January 2019 under their Famitsu Bunko imprint.

A manga adaptation with art by Dashio Tsukimi and composition by Ryō Suzukaze has been serialized online via ASCII Media Works' Dengeki PlayStation Comic Web website since July 2019 and has been collected in five tankōbon volumes. Both the light novel and manga are licensed in North America by Yen Press. An anime television series adaptation by Maho Film aired from January to March 2022.

Plot summary
In Japan, a VR-accessed multi-player online fantasy role-playing game (VRMMORPG) named Leadale, which offers a very liberal customization system, has become immensely popular in recent years. A young girl named Keina Kagami, rendered permanently paralyzed and on constant life support, uses this game from her hospital bed to interact with the rest of the world. When she unexpectedly dies after her life support shuts down during a power outage, she finds herself reborn into the game world of Leadale, in the body of her personal avatar Cayna. To her surprise, she also finds out that 200 years have passed in Leadale since she last logged into the game, a period in which the seven nations she knew were devastated by war and re-organized into three new kingdoms.

As Cayna begins making her way in this new world and meeting the three NPC children she had adopted in the game, she finds out that her death ruined Leadale's reputation, causing the game's shutdown. However, several other players ended up trapped inside the game as well, some of them for years, and the kingdoms of Felskeilo, Helshper and Otaloquess are increasingly plagued by attacks from high-level monsters, all stemming from Leadale's abrupt cancellation, which made them go rogue inside this world. What's more, after she meets her former mentor to the game, Opus, in the game again that she learns that Leadale was specifically created to help her out of her isolation following her accident, but was commercialized afterwards. The game had, however, the unfortunate side effect of displacing the minds of several players into the virtual Leadale world. After Keina's death, Opus synchronized the game system with her new elven soul, essentially making it into a real living world.

Characters

Players and Skill Masters
 / 

Originally the 17-year-old daughter of a wealthy Japanese family, Keina was rendered a permanent hospital patient on life support for several years by a terrible accident in which her parents were killed. When her life support fails in the midst of a game session, Keina dies, but her mind is uploaded into the world of Leadale as her RPG avatar Cayna, a powerful high elf mage (in-game level 1,100). In Leadale, she specializes in summoning magic, and as an elf, she can also communicate with plants, which makes harvesting plant materials in her presence an unsettling undertaking.In the game, Keina had also attained the extremely rare levels of one of twenty-four Limit Breakers and the third of thirteen Skill Masters, who act as assistant game administrators and are capable of bestowing other player characters with free skills at will. When demands for these services kept mounting, Cayna was forced into seclusion, and the subsequent creation of several Guardian Towers to make those players actually earn these skills was initiated. After meeting Opus in Leadale again, she is shocked to discover that for some reason, Opus bonded her soul to the game's matrix after her death, essentially making her the game's living central processor and heartpiece; the assimilation took two centuries to complete, at the end of which time Opus arranged for her reawakening in Marelle's inn.Cayna is infamously known under the bynames  and Ferocious Firepower, from the trademark power-boosting magical item she received upon becoming a Skill Master.
 /  / 
Leadale's thirteenth Skill Master and a Black Kingdom demon avatar (level 1,100) of a player ostensibly installed by Leadale's administrative company to observe the game and report any bugs or malfunctions. His accumulated knowledge of the game's and its players' procedures has made him a master strategist, earning him the nickname "Leadale's Kongming". Like Cayna, he was a member of Cream Cheese, a group of Leadale gamers which included both the game aces (the Limit Breakers) and some of the rowdier players, and also Keina's mentor when she had first entered the game. Crescent Moon Castle, his Guardian Tower in the kingdom of Helshper, is a reflection of his penchant for sadism, as it is riddled with all kinds of deadly traps; hence it is known as the House of Murder and Malice.It is only much later, after Cayna meets Opus in Leadale again, that she learns that Opus is actually one of the Leadale game's original creators and administrators named Rin Kuzuhara, who once visited Keina at the hospital to introduce her to the game. He also raises Cayna's level to 1,109 and gives her a set of new special abilities.

A sliver dragoid player avatar (level 427), current leader of the Felskeilo Knights, and former subleader of the Silver Moon Horsemen Guild.

A male human adventurer player avatar (level 392) and a former guildmate of Shining Saber. His user has been trapped inside his avatar for ten years in Leadale, making him reach his early thirties.

A female human adventurer player avatar (level 430) for a male user, who apparently used a "hack" on the game system in order to play as a female. A relatively new player, she met up with Exis by chance after the game service ended. Her true gender is revealed by her frequent lapses into masculine speech; in the anime series, it is additionally emphasized by the use of a male voice actor.

A dragoid adventurer player avatar (level 630) whose name is a shortening of Xxxxxxxxxxxx. Exis was originally a secondary character used by the same player, whose original primary avatar was Tartarus (nicknamed "Tartar Sauce" by Cayna, and "Tartaroast" by Opus). Like Cayna and Opus, he is a former member of the Cream Cheese Guild.

A child Leadale player with a demon avatar. After getting stranded in Leadale, and being convinced this was still "just a game", he became a bandit leader and started wreaking havoc in Helshper to level up. Easily defeated by Cayna, but proving virtually unkillable by execution because of the game's health point system, he was instead sentenced to hard labor in a mine. After spending some time under forced labor, Caerina takes him in as a recruit for Helspher's army.

Leadale's first Skill Master, whose avatar was a werecat. She has a compulsion to collect information and compile it into statistics, and she thrives on tests to her intellect. Her Guardian Tower is one of the few ones with no fixed location; it is instead located in the innards of a huge whale, and its interior decorations were originally meant to emulate a setting from Pinocchio, her favorite childhood story.
Liothek
Leadale's sixth Skill Master, a female player who has a grotesque passion for creepy things and pets, like amphibians, mollusks and crustaceans. Her Guardian Tower, the Palace of the Dragon King, is located underwater near the Felskeilo coastline, near Luka's former home village.
Kyotaro
Leadale's ninth Skill Master who used a dragoid as his game avatar, and the master of the Silver Moon Horsemen Guild. His Guardian Tower is located on the site on which the Felskeilo capitol arena is erected during the 200-year span between Keina's last login and her rebirth.
Kujo
Leadale's second Skill Master. His mobile Guardian Tower, which is located on the back of a titanic turtle, is a TV station guarded by a living Buddha statue who challenges intruders to a hundred-questions quiz about the game.
Hidden Ogre ("Gramps")
Leadale's twelfth Skill Master (level 800), with a dwarf avatar. On Earth, he was a retiree who now regrets that he spent too much time with the game after his wife died. To alleviate his loneliness, he used the Foster System to adopt 108 little sisters. He was also trapped in Leadale when the game was taken offline, and has regularly sought out Kujo's Guardian Tower to try and solve its quiz. His Guardian Tower is a traditional Japanese mansion floating in the sky.
Jaeger
A player (level 800) who uses a huge, muscular human as his avatar. He is the former leader of the Silver Watches, a guild based in the former Red Kingdom. He is both a close friend and a rival of Opus (who he habitually calls "Heimer"), with whom he had alernatively clashed and cooperated during the game era. After getting stranded in Leadale, he opened a curio shop and got married.

Summons and Familiars

An AI support unit created by Keina's uncle to assist her after she was permanently paralyzed. After her rebirth in Leadale, Cayna is still able to access it (consequently, only she can perceive and interact with Key, although later Opus is later found to have that ability as well), and it serves as her advisor and protector.
 / 
A game character appearing as a type of familiar, this tiny, green-haired fairy was bequeathed to Cayna by Opus when she sought his Guardian Tower out. Because of her nature, initially only Cayna and the other players stuck in Leadale can see her. After Opus prompts her, Cayna eventually names the fairy "Kuu" (as a counterpart to Key), thus giving her a material form. It is later revealed that Kuu is a manifestation of the Leadale game's subsystem installed into Cayna.
 

A werecat pair of butler and maid (both level 550), and originally NPCs summoned by Cayna's magic while playing the game on Earth; Roxilius was created by Cayna, but Opus added Roxine as a gesture of his twisted humor. Upon first summoning Roxilius some time after her rebirth in Leadale, Cayna discovered that Roxilius inexplicably did not disappear after his summoning duration had expired, so she also summoned Roxine to have them both take over the daily chores in her newly founded household. While Roxilius is well-behaved and polite, Roxine is confrontational, arrogant and sharp-tongued, especially against Roxilius. This rivalry habitually results in bitter duels between the two, which Cayna must break up on an all-too regular basis. Their names are a reference to the number 64 (六十四, rokujūshi), which stands for Keina's birthday on June 4.

A centaur warrior (level 250) who is occasionally summoned by Cayna as an auxiliary.
Siren
A beautiful black-haired elven maid summons (level 550) created by Opus. While she is very polite and sweet to strangers, she is not that way to Opus, showering him with scathing remarks all the time after he displaced himself into the Leadale world, whereas she was submissive and obedient before, much to Opus' own surprise. Due to a cheat Opus used, she is also much stronger than her level would indicate. After Opus and she move in with Cayna in the Remote Village, she becomes the household's headmaid.

Kingdom of Felskeilo

A male high elf priest (level 300), and Cayna's first child, adopted via the game's Foster System, which converts unused alternative player characters into named NPCs when adopted by an active player. He is specialized in healing magic, and is highly revered in the kingdom of Felskeilo due to his radiant personality, which usually manifests his moods in an illusionary aura of flowers (a peculiar but essentially useless special effect added by the game's administrators). However, he also has an unbelievably huge mother complex.

A female high elf archmage (level 300), and Cayna's second child. She tends to be a bit airheaded and exuberant, especially about her mother. Formerly a magician at Felskeilo's royal court, she now occupies the position of headmistress of the local Royal Academy. Married twice, she had fraternal twin children with her first husband.

A male dwarf shipwright (level 300) at the wharfs of Felskeilo's capital, and Cayna's third child. While he is the most level-headed of his siblings and loves his mother, he does not enjoy being treated like a child in public, keen to preserve his image as a tough, no-nonsense boss. He is also responsible for "baptizing" (i.e., physically disciplining) new recruits and unruly elements among Felskeilo's royal knights.

Marelle's younger, pre-adolescent daughter who befriends Cayna and adores her for her magic and her kindness.

A pre-adolescent human girl who originally lived in an Felskeilo fishing village near one of the Guardian Towers, the Palace of the Dragon King. Her village was eradicated when an undead Event Monster released a death mist on the settlement, turning its inhabitants into zombies; Luka escaped that fate because she was inside a magically warded storehouse. After being rescued by Cayna, Quolkeh and Exis, she is taken in by Cayna as her new adopted daughter.

The proprietress of the Remote Village inn in which Keina awakens when reborn in Leadale. While being a maternal type of person, she does not hesitate to clout anyone on the head who vexes her.

Marelle's oldest, adult daughter.

Marelle's husband and co-owner of the inn.

A hunter in the Remote Village.

A well-known and friendly kobold merchant. Even though he is the owner of a large trading company, he prefers to travel and peddle his wares in person. His design is patterned after a Welsh Corgi.

A female kobold, and Elineh's wife and co-owner of their merchant business. She uses a magical item to disguise herself as a human and joke-shock new customers with it. Her appearance is similar to a black and white papillon.

The leader of the Flame Spears, a mercenary company employed by Elineh as caravan guards, and the former captain of the Felskeilo knights. Ever since Cayna saved one of his men from a lethal injury, he holds her in the highest regard, although he is occasionally disconcerted by her casual use of her tremendous magical powers.

A member of the Flame Spears whom Cayna saved from a fatal injury.

A human professor for alchemy at Felskeilo's Royal Academy, and Mai-Mai's second husband. He is the son of a baron family who owns the land the Remote Village is on.

The pre-adolescent royal prince of Felskeilo who is annoyed with his life in the royal palace and keeps running away to play with his friends in the capital's streets. After Cayna helps retrieving him shortly after arriving in the city, he becomes determined to find out her true nature, suspecting that she has something sinister in mind. Because Lonti interrupted herself before giving away the boy's secret identity, the fractional "den-" (from 殿下 denka; "Highness" in Japanese) she uttered was used by Cayna, who is aware of the boy's true nature, to nickname him "Densuke". (In the English translation, she uses "Primo" - from "Pri-" for "prince" - instead.)

Felskeilo's prime minister. He maintains a very active network of spies to inform him of any undue activities, and keeps himself well-informed about Cayna's escapades in the Felskelio capital.

Agaido's granddaughter, a shy marquess, first-year student at the Royal Academy of Felskeilo, and Primo's stressed-out minder.

Felskeilo's crown princess, Primo's older sister, and a friend of Lonti's from the Royal Academy who has a vast crush on Skargo.

A red-haired female human clerk at the Felskeilo Adventurers' Guild.

A mermaid who was made an outcast in her village after failing to meet her people's expectations for becoming a princess and securing their race's continuance. She was later trapped by a freak magical portal in an underwater vein near the Remote Village. Cayna ends up rescuing her and offering her quarters in the village, where Mimily has founded a laundry business.
Triste and Alnassi
The king and queen of Felskeilo.

Kingdom of Helshper

Mai-Mai's older daughter, a young  elf who is a combat instructor for the Knights of Helshper.

Mai-Mai's younger son, an elf merchant in Helshper and owner of an intercontinentally very successful business named Sakaiya.

Caerick's son, Cayna's great-grandson and Sakaiya's deputy master.
A family group of Helshper engineers in Caerick's employ who come to Lytt's village to study a water-drawing mechanism Cayna had invented for the villager's comfort. While Lux, Dogai and Latem are dwarves, Sunya is a human; additionally, Lux and Sunya are a married couple, Dogai is Lux's apprentice, and Latem is Lux's pre-adolescent son from a previous marriage.

Kingdom of Otaloquess

Sahana is a high-elf player avatar and Cayna's adopted sister.

Sahana's daughter through the game's Foster System, Cayna's niece, and the reigning queen of the kingdom of Otaloquess. Her prime duty is to watch the barriers around the Abandoned Capital, the former capital of the Game Era's Brown Kingdom which is now a haven for powerful monsters. She, as well as her prime minister and captain of the royal knights, are somehow aware of their true natures in the Leadale game.
 
Two brother and sister werecat spies from the kingdom of Otaloquess (level 80). Similar to Roxilius and Roxine, Cloffe, as the male, is polite and composed, while Clofia is very aggressive and temperamental.

Others
Keisuke Kagami
The younger brother of Keina's father and the owner of the company who created Leadale, who became Keina's guardian after her parents' death. He has a daughter named Ako.

An evil minor devil subservient to Leadale's Lord of the Night, also known as the Dream God. His body has the shape of a roughly humanoid tree, with a human skull floating inside a hollow in its trunk. Considering himself a sculptor, he has the unsavory habit of reshaping living human beings into gruesomely bizarre works of "art", and creating art which twists the minds of anyone beholding it.

Igdukyz's partner, a huge black-scaled, six-armed Demon Dragoid.

Media

Light novel
In the Land of Leadale is written by Ceez and illustrated by Tenmaso. Originally serialized online on the Shōsetsuka ni Narō website between November 2010 and December 2012, Enterbrain began publishing the series in print in January 2019 under their Famitsu Bunko imprint. Eight volumes have been released so far. Yen Press licensed the series in North America.

Manga
A manga adaptation illustrated by Dashio Tsukimi and composed by Ryō Suzukaze began serialization online via ASCII Media Works' Dengeki PlayStation Comic Web website in July 2019. Five tankōbon volumes have been released so far. Yen Press has also licensed the manga and will release the first volume in March 2022.

Anime
On February 22, 2021, an anime adaptation was announced. At "Kadokawa Light Novel Expo 2020", it was revealed to be a television series animated by Maho Film. The series is directed by Takeyuki Yanase, with scripts overseen by Kazuyuki Fudeyasu, character designs handled by Toshihide Matsudate, Eri Kojima, and Kaho Deguchi, and music composed by Kujira Yumemi. The series aired from January 5 to March 23, 2022, on Tokyo MX and other networks. The opening theme song is "Happy encount" by TRUE, while the ending theme song is "Hakoniwa no Kōfuku" (Happiness in a Miniature Garden) by Azusa Tadokoro. Crunchyroll licensed the series.

On January 13, 2022, Crunchyroll announced that the series will receive an English dub, which premiered on February 16.

Episode list

Notes

References

External links
  at Shōsetsuka ni Narō 
  
  
  
 

2019 Japanese novels
2022 anime television series debuts
Anime and manga based on light novels
ASCII Media Works manga
Crunchyroll anime
Dengeki Comics
Famitsu Bunko
Fiction about reincarnation
Isekai anime and manga
Isekai novels and light novels
Japanese webcomics
Kadokawa Dwango franchises
Light novels
Light novels first published online
Maho Film
Seinen manga
Shōsetsuka ni Narō
Webcomics in print
Yen Press titles